The Laos national futsal team is controlled by the Lao Football Federation, the governing body for futsal in Laos and represents the country in international futsal competitions.

Tournaments

FIFA Futsal World Cup
 1989 – Did not enter
 1992 – Did not enter
 1996 – Did not enter
 2000 – Did not enter
 2004 – Did not enter
 2008 – Did not enter
 2012 – Did not enter
 2016 – Did not qualify
 2020 – Did not qualify

AFC Futsal Championship
 1999 – Did not enter
 2000 – Did not enter
 2001 – Did not enter
 2002 – Did not enter
 2003 – Did not enter
 2004 – Did not enter
 2005 – Did not enter
 2006 – Did not enter
 2007 – Did not enter
 2008 – Did not enter
 2010 – Did not enter
 2012 – Did not enter
 2014 – Did not qualify
 2016 – Did not qualify
 2018 – Did not qualify

AFF Futsal Championship
 2001–2007 – Did not enter
 2008 – Group stage
 2009–2010 – Did not enter
 2012–2015 – Group stage
 2016–2017 – Group Stage

Players

Current squad 
The following players were called up for the 2013 AFF Futsal Championship in Thailand during 19 – 27 October 2013.

References

Laos
Futsal
Futsal in Laos